The Yerba Buena Tunnel, also known as the Yerba Buena Island Tunnel, is a highway tunnel in San Francisco, California. It is the part of San Francisco–Oakland Bay Bridge complex that crosses Yerba Buena Island. The Yerba Buena Tunnel carries ten lanes of Interstate 80 (I-80) on two decks, connecting the two component spans of the Bay Bridge, the western suspension span and the eastern self-anchored suspension span. At the opening of the Bay Bridge in 1936, it was the world's largest-bore tunnel.

History
Preliminary surveys to lay out the route of the planned Bay Bridge were held in April 1931. Dedication ceremonies were held on February 24, 1932, and by April 1932, the final design for the Bay Bridge, including the single-bore tunnel through Yerba Buena Island, had been completed and submitted for approval. The contract to build the Yerba Buena Cable Anchorage, Tunnel & Viaduct segment was opened for bids on March 28, 1933, and awarded to the low bidder, Clinton Construction Company of California, for $1,821,129.50 (equivalent to $ in ). Yerba Buena Island was the main site of the official groundbreaking for the Bay Bridge on July 9, 1933, when President Franklin D. Roosevelt remotely set off a dynamite blast on the eastern side of the island at 12:58 p.m. local time. Former President Herbert Hoover and Governor James Rolph were onsite; the two men were the first to turn over the earth with ceremonial golden spades. Other ceremonies took place simultaneously in San Francisco (on Rincon Hill) and Oakland Harbor.

The Yerba Buena Tunnel opened, along with the rest of the Bay Bridge, on November 12, 1936.  the tunnel lacks an official name.

Corrosion
On January 30, 2016, a chunk of concrete the size of an automobile tire fell from the tunnel wall into the slow lane of eastbound traffic on the lower deck of the Yerba Buena Tunnel, causing a minor accident. The concrete fell from where the upper deck is connected to the tunnel wall. Based on an examination of photographs, a professor from Georgia Tech postulated that water infiltration into the concrete wall had caused the reinforcing steel to corrode and expand, forcing a chunk of the tunnel wall out. A subsequent California Department of Transportation (Caltrans) investigation identified 12 spots on both sides of the tunnel wall in the lower deck space showed signs of corrosion-induced damage, but no immediate risk of further spalling. The apparent cause was rainwater leaking from upper deck drains. Caltrans engineers speculated the Masonite pads had swelled due to rainwater infiltration, cracking the tunnel walls and allowing moisture in to the reinforcing steel.

Repairs to the degraded concrete started in February 2017. Drains and catch basins were replaced to reduce the likelihood of clogging, and fiberglass-reinforced mortar was used to patch removed concrete. The repairs, which required some daytime lane closures, were expected to last until June 2017.

Design and construction
California Department of Transportation engineer C.H. Purcell served as chief engineer for the Bay Bridge, including the construction of the Yerba Buena Tunnel. Before starting excavation, the ground through which the western half of the tunnel would be bored was stabilized by injecting cement grout under pressure through 25  holes bored into the loose rock over the crown of the tunnel.

After excavating the western and eastern open portals, three drifts were bored from west to east along the path of the tunnel: one at the crown and the other two at the lower corners. The first drift broke through in July 1934, approximately one year after the start of construction. A ceremonial party led by Governor Merriam celebrated the completion of the first  drift on July 24 by walking through it, followed by a short speech. No cave-ins occurred during the excavation of the tunnel.

After the roof was completed, the remaining core of rock between the tunnel roof and lower deck was excavated using a power shovel. By May 1935, work on removing the core was progressing and 40 steel ribs had been placed; concrete embedment was just starting. Removal of the core was completed on November 18, 1935. Once the excavation was complete, the upper deck was placed and the interior ceiling above the upper deck was lined with tiles. The last concrete poured during the construction of the Bay Bridge was part of the upper deck lining in late summer 1936.  This included the emplacement of regularly spaced refuge bays ("deadman holes") along the south wall of the lower deck tunnel, escape alcoves common in all railway tunnels into which track maintenance workers could duck if a train came along. These remain and are visible to eastbound motorists today.

In 1936, it was hailed as the world's largest-bore tunnel.

Decks and The Hump

The tunnel has two decks. The initial design in 1932 called for the two rail tracks to flank a central truck deck on the lower level. After Key System trains stopped running over the bridge in 1958, bids were opened on October 11, 1960, to rebuild the tunnel. The rebuild consisted of multiple stages of work:
 Remove Key System rails, lower rail deck and repave
 Remove center columns supporting upper deck

After the reconstruction, the tunnel would handle only road traffic. The upper deck was lowered to accommodate heavy truck traffic, as each deck would now carry five lanes of unidirectional traffic. The upper deck was dedicated to westbound traffic, and the lower deck was dedicated to eastbound traffic. The first accident caused by "The Hump", the nickname the bridge acquired after prominent warning signs advertising its presence, occurred just twelve minutes after it was first deployed on November 25, 1961.

One side of each half rested on a temporary falsework erected in the middle of the lower deck, and the other side rested on the shoulder of the tunnel wall previously used to support the old upper deck. After the two halves were fastened together, a steel form was used to close the  gap between halves, and concrete was poured in the gap. The upper deck rests on  shoulders built into the tunnel wall, padded by  Masonite.

The planned completion date for tunnel reconstruction was July 1962, but "The Hump" was not dismantled until October 27, 1962. The San Francisco Chronicle marked the occasion by quipping "[The Hump] produced more jams than Grandma ever made." After reconstruction, both the upper and lower decks featured  of vertical clearance. Upper deck clearance is restricted by the tunnel portal, and lower deck clearance is restricted by the upper deck.

Gallery

References

External links
 
 
 
 

Road tunnels in California
Tunnels in San Francisco
Tunnels completed in 1936
1936 establishments in California